Ee Rojullo is a 2012 Indian Telugu-language romantic comedy film directed by debutant director Maruthi. It stars debutants Srinivas, Reshma and Saikumar Pampana. The film is produced by Good Friends group on a low budget. The film was one of the most successful Telugu films in 2012. The film was remade in Kannada as Preethi Prema and released on 17 February 2017. Maruthi won SIIMA Award for Best Debut Director (Telugu).

Plot
This story examines the lack of moral and ethical values in a relationship and the search for true love.

Sri (Srinivas) is madly in love with Rajini. He even gives her Rs 3 lakhs to help her but as fate turns out, Rajini does not really love Sri. She escapes with the money along with another man. This leaves Sri heartbroken. He decides never to fall in love again and he starts looking at women in a negative way. In another track, Shreya (Reshma) is friendly with a guy called Kishore. Kishore misunderstands Shreya's friendship for love and he starts developing feelings for her. He starts acting possessively and begins hounding Shreya in the name of love. A disgusted Shreya decides never to be on friendly terms with any guy.

The lives of Sri and Shreya converge and they start off by quarreling with each other. Sri is forced to lie to his landlords that he is married as the apartment is not available for Bachelors. Once Shreya discovers that Sri is married, she softens her stand and starts becoming friendly with Sri. Later they both understand that all boys and girls are not bad and Sri starts protecting Shreya from Kishore. But Shreya's parents were not happy with their friendship they warns Shreya to keep her distance from Sri. Just when their mutual admiration begins to develop, Rajini comes back as his wife. After knowing Rajini is back Shreya leaves US for her Masters with a broken heart. Later Sri follows Rajini along with his friend Sai to an unofficial hukka bar.

There he finds out that the guy who eloped with Rajini cheated her and ran away with her money. Currently she is in debt. Sri transfers money to Rajini with a good heart and warns her to not play with others' feelings. Then suddenly it was interrupted by Kishore and he reveals his intention to meet Sri. Then he turns out to be a fraud. He hatches a plan to have sex with Shreya so he befriended with her later proposes her. Instead of accepting she started avoiding him then he tries to force her to love him. But it all was in vain because of Sri. Later he tries to kill Shreya but at that time she is with Sri. Then he hatched a plan to separate them so he enquired about Sri and finds about his story. He uses Rajini as a pawn in his game to divide them successfully. Then Kishore and his friends tries to kill Sri and Sai. A fight ensues between Sri and Kishore then Sri bashes Kishore badly and successfully escapes with Sai later he confess all the things to shreya.

After two years Shreya and Sri marry with her parents acceptance. The film ends with Sai narrating Sri's story to producer Tammareddy Bharadwaja and is approved to direct a film.

Cast
 Mangam Srinivas as Srinivas Rao "Sri"
 Reshma Rathore as Shreya
 Saikumar Pampana as Sri's friend
 Bhargavi as Bhargavi
 Ambati Srinivas as Watchman Manamma
 Shankar Rao
 M. S. Narayana as Sattiraju, Sri's uncle
 Madhumani as Shreya's mother
 Kedar Shankara as Shreya's father
 Venky
 Ragini as Sri's aunt
 Rambabu
 Anandhi in a special appearance in the song "Cell Song"
 Anchor Ravi
 Tammareddy Bharadwaja as Himself

Reception
The Times of India gave a review of rating 3.5/5 stating "Your hero does not have a six-pack, nor does he make a grand entry. Your heroine is not the glamorous type and there's no skin show. There's no chasing of villains and beating them to pulp. There's no star cast to boast of, but "Ee Rojullo" is a film that you would enjoy with the comedy being seamlessly woven into the script." greatandhra.com gave a review of rating 3.25/5 stating "This is the film that entertained the targeted audience perfectly. On the other hand economically, this is the wisest move. But it appeared no where that the film was made with low budget. Watch it if your heart is youthful." Oneindia Entertainment gave a review stating "Ee Rojullo is a decent film made on a small budget but still boasts of good production values. The film is targeted at the youth and they would connect with the film in a big way. The film, however, may not appeal much to the family audiences. Still, Ee Rojullo is a decent, interesting as well as entertaining film." idlebrain.com gave a review of rating 3.25/5 stating "First half of the film is fun and second half has story. The plus points of the film are freshness and contemporary feel. The second half should have been more compact and the obscene dialogues/gestures should have been moderated. This film might not find a place for the people who may find certain dialogues and references to be offensive. But will go well with youth and masses. You may watch it." Rediff.com gave a review of rating 2/5 stating "Perhaps a youthful subject like Ee Rojullo may go down well with urban youngsters." 123telugu.com gave a review of rating 3.25/5 stating "Ee Rojullo is a movie that will work big time with young adults and students. The movie has is high on entertainment and it is a good youth entertainer. Family crowds may not enjoy the film but then, this movie was never made for them. This is an enjoyable film and the producers have a winner on their hands." cinegoer.com gave a review stating "Ee Rojullo comes as an underdog but it has all the indications of working well with a group and more. There is a need to encourage such kind of cinema and filmmakers; watch this and you will walk out without any complaints. This one reminds us of the new age Bollywood cinema and gives us a confidence that there is definitely a future for young filmmakers ee rojullo!" truthdive.com gave a review of rating 3.5/5 stating "Ee Rojullo is a decent, interesting as well as entertaining film. The movie seems like a winner with the young audience especially college crowd."

Soundtrack

The Audio Release event was held at Rock Heights in Madhapur, Hydereabad on 9 February 2012. Actor Allu Arjun, Allu Aravind, Director Maruti, Reshma, Srinivas, Richa Gangopadhyay, Madhurima graced the event.

The Music was composed by J.B. and lyrics were by Kasarla Shyam and Karunakar Adigarlla. The soundtrack consists of 7 tracks with 1 instrumental theme song. The audio rights were sold to Sa Re Ga Ma. Of the songs, "Ring Tring" and "Cell Song" were best received.

Box office
Ee Rojullo was very successful at the box office, completing 50 days in 53 centres, 100 days on 1 July 2012, 175 days on 13 September 2012, and 365 days on 23 March 2013.

References

External links
 

2010s Telugu-language films
Telugu films remade in other languages
2012 romantic comedy films
Indian romantic comedy films
2012 directorial debut films
2012 films
Films directed by Maruthi